Pamela Gail Fryman (born August 19, 1959) is an American sitcom director and producer. She directed all but twelve episodes of the television series How I Met Your Mother.

Early life
Fryman was born and grew up in Philadelphia, Pennsylvania.

Career
Fryman got her first job on The John Davidson Show as an assistant to the talent coordinator, and went on to be a booth production assistant and secretary on Santa Barbara, eventually moving up to assistant director (AD), and director. In 1993, producer Peter Noah, with whom she had worked on the game show Dream House, gave Fryman a chance to direct an episode of the short-lived sitcom Café Americain. These would be the first stepping stones toward a long and successful career.

Before her directing career blossomed, Fryman pursued stage directing. On the set of Frasier, rehearsal resembled a play staging, which is exactly what creator and executive producer David Lee had in mind when he hired her. Fryman directed 34 episodes of the show from seasons four through eight.

Fryman directed the majority of the episodes of How I Met Your Mother. Show creator Craig Thomas praised her communication skills, saying, "She makes everyone feel they've been heard and respected and she can connect with anyone."
Though Fryman's original career plan did not include directing (she figured she would "follow in her father's footsteps in merchandising"), she has grown to realize that directing is her forte and passion. In Variety magazine, Fryman said that continuing to direct How I Met Your Mother is her fantasy realized. In 2014, she officiated the wedding of How I Met Your Mother star Neil Patrick Harris and David Burtka, who played a side role in the show.

Awards 
Fryman has received recognition from the Academy of Television Arts & Sciences also known as the (ATAS), the National Academy of Television Arts and Sciences, the Directors Guild of America, Goldderby.com, the Online Film & Television Association also known as the (OFTA), and the Women in Film organization.

 1990 Won - Daytime Emmy Award for Outstanding Drama Series Directing Team (Santa Barbara)
 1991 Won - Daytime Emmy Award for Outstanding Drama Series Directing Team (Santa Barbara)
 1998 Nominated - Directors Guild Award for Outstanding Directorial Achievement in Comedy Series ("Halloween (Part 1)") (Frasier)
 1999 Nominated - Directors Guild Award for Outstanding Directorial Achievement in Comedy Series ("Two Girls for Every Boy") (Just Shoot Me!)
 2000 Nominated - Directors Guild Award for Outstanding Directorial Achievement in Comedy Series ("The Flight Before Christmas") (Frasier)
 2001 Nominated - Directors Guild Award for Outstanding Directorial Achievement in Comedy Series ("And The Dish Ran Away With The Spoon (Part 1 & 2)") (Frasier)
 2009 Nominated - Primetime Emmy Award for Outstanding Comedy Series (How I Met Your Mother)
 2011 Nominated - Online Film & Television Association Award for Best Direction in a Comedy Series (How I Met Your Mother)
 2011 Nominated - Primetime Emmy Award for Outstanding Directing for a Comedy Series ("Subway Wars") (How I Met Your Mother)
 2011 Won - Women in Film Crystal + Lucy Award, Dorothy Arzner Directors Award
 2020 Nominated - Primetime Emmy Award for Outstanding Directing for a Variety Special (Live in Front of a Studio Audience: "All in the Family" and "Good Times") (shared with Andy Fisher)

Filmography

Film

Television

References

External links
 
 

Living people
American television directors
Television producers from Pennsylvania
American women television producers
Daytime Emmy Award winners
American women television directors
Businesspeople from Philadelphia
21st-century American women
1959 births